George Bruce OBE (10 March 1909 – 25 July 2002)  was a Scottish poet and radio journalist.

He was educated at Fraserburgh Academy and Aberdeen University and later taught at Dundee High School, commuting across the Tay from Wormit in Fife. 

He was a BBC producer at Aberdeen (1946-1956) and Edinburgh (1956-1970). He co-produced the radio programmes Scottish Art and Letters and Arts Review. Later he was fellow in creative writing   at Glasgow University (1971–73) and visiting professor in US and Australia. In 1975-1976 he was the executive editor of The Scottish Review.

In 1984 he was awarded OBE. His book Pursuit won the Saltire Society award (1999) for Scottish Book of the Year. His portrait (oil on panel, by Colin Dunbar, 1970) is in the collection of the Scottish National Portrait Gallery.

Books
1944: Sea Talk
1967: Landscapes and Figures
1967: Perspectives
1970: Collected Poems
1986: A Scottish Postbag, co-edited with Paul Scott,  an anthology of Scottish letters from the 13th century to the present
1999: Pursuit
2001: Woman of the North Sea, a book of art, co-produced with artist John Bellany
2007: The Singing of the Foxes
To Foster and Enrich a history of the Saltire Society.

Articles
 F.G. Scott 1880 - 1958, in Cencrastus No. 4, Winter 1980-81, pp. 25 & 26,

Further reading
 Hubbard, Tom (2021), "The Poetry of George Bruce", in Hubbard, Tom (2022), Invitation to the Voyage: Scotland, Europe and Literature, Rymour, pp. 84 - 88,

References

1909 births
2002 deaths
Scottish poets
Scottish radio producers
Alumni of the University of Aberdeen
Academics of the University of Glasgow
People educated at Fraserburgh Academy